Mineral Ridge National Recreation Trail is a backcountry hiking area near Lake Coeur d'Alene in Kootenai County, Idaho, United States.  It is administered by the Bureau of Land Management (BLM). Construction began on the trail in 1963 and the area was designated as a National Recreation Trail in 1982. There is a self-guided interpretive tour along the  trail.

Flora
The two main types of trees along the trail are Ponderosa Pine and Douglas Fir.

See also

References

External links
 BLM site
 

Hiking trails in Idaho
National Recreation Trails in Idaho
Protected areas of Kootenai County, Idaho
Bureau of Land Management areas in Idaho
1963 establishments in Idaho